Kundaveli (West) is a village in the Udayarpalayam taluk of Ariyalur district, Tamil Nadu, India.

Demographics 

As per the 2001 census, Kundaveli (West) had a total population of 2377 with 1185 males and 1192 females.

References 

Villages in Ariyalur district